Semaeopus cantona is a species of geometrid moth in the family Geometridae. It is found in Central America.

The MONA or Hodges number for Semaeopus cantona is 7143.

References

Further reading

 
 

Cosymbiini
Articles created by Qbugbot
Moths described in 1901